Edwin Elliott Carnett (October 21, 1916 – November 4, 2016) was a left fielder and pitcher in Major League Baseball who played for three different teams from 1941 to 1945. He was born in Springfield, Missouri.

Baseball career
Carnett was noticed by big league scouts when he was pitching in high school. He was signed by the Chicago Cubs in 1935, assigned to the Class C Ponca City Angels of the Western Association in his hometown, Ponca City, Oklahoma, and won 19 games. In 1936, he was in spring training with the Los Angeles Angels, the Cubs' top farm club in the Pacific Coast League, but an accident during a "pepper" game led to a serious shoulder injury that jeopardized his career. He was reassigned back to Ponca City, pitched with the injury and lost ten straight games, took off some time to work on his hitting, and then won 16 consecutive games.

Carnett, nicknamed "Lefty", entered the major leagues in 1941 with the Boston Braves, playing in two games before joining the United States Navy during World War II (1942–43). After he was discharged, he played for the Chicago White Sox in 1944 and the Cleveland Indians in 1945, mostly as an outfielder and first baseman. In his three-season career, Carnett pitched 5 innings in six appearances, and posted a 3.40 earned run average with four strikeouts, three walks, and no decisions. His career batting statistics included a .268 batting average with 25 doubles, 8 triples, 1 home run, and 67 runs batted in.

After World War II ended, he played for the AAA PCL Seattle Rainiers in 1946 before returning to Class C balls and eventually returned to Ponca City to play for the Jets in 1954 and 1955 prior to their moving to Gainesville, Texas.

Death
Carnett died in November 2016 in Ringling, Oklahoma, two weeks after celebrating his 100th birthday. At the time of his death, he was the oldest living former Major League Baseball player; that distinction then passed to Bobby Doerr, who was born on April 7, 1918.

See also
List of centenarians (Major League Baseball players)
List of centenarians (sportspeople)

References

Further reading

External links

1916 births
2016 deaths
Abilene Blue Sox players
Albuquerque Dukes players
American centenarians
Men centenarians
United States Navy personnel of World War II
Baseball players from Missouri
Binghamton Triplets players
Borger Gassers players
Boston Braves players
Chicago White Sox players
Cleveland Indians players
Gainesville Owls players
Kansas City Blues players
Los Angeles Angels (minor league) players
Major League Baseball pitchers
Minor league baseball managers
Milwaukee Brewers (minor league) players
Newark Bears players
Paris Red Peppers players
Ponca City Angels players
Ponca City Cubs players
Ponca City Jets players
Seattle Rainiers players
Sportspeople from Springfield, Missouri
Tulsa Oilers (baseball) players
Vancouver Capilanos players
Wichita Falls Spudders players
United States Navy sailors